Gupt: The Hidden Truth is a 1997 Indian Hindi-language thriller film directed by Rajiv Rai and featuring Bobby Deol in the lead role along with Manisha Koirala, Kajol, and Om Puri, with Raj Babbar and Kulbhushan Kharbanda in an extended cameo. Distributed under the banner Trimurti Films, it also stars Paresh Rawal, Dalip Tahil, Prem Chopra, Sadashiv Amrapurkar, Sharat Saxena, Mukesh Rishi, and Priya Tendulkar in supporting roles. The soundtrack of the film was composed by Viju Shah It is considered as one of the best thriller movies from Hindi Cinema.

At the 43rd Filmfare Awards, Gupt: The Hidden Truth received 8 nominations, including Best Film and Best Director (Rai), and won 3 awards, including Best Villain.

Plot

Governor Jaisingh Sinha, a prominent political figure, presides over a meeting taken by influential industrialist Meghnad Chaudhry, socialist Union leader Vilas Rao, minister Mantriji and others. Jaisingh's stepson Sahil is an unattached and easy-going young man, who resents him. 

Sinha's personal secretary Ishwar Dewan's daughter Isha is Sahil's beloved, with whom he reunites after a long time as Isha was sent to boarding school in past. They fall in love, however Meghnad's daughter Sheetal is also in love with Sahil, but he only considers her a very good friend.

Sinha announces Sahil's engagement to Sheetal, leading to an argument. Sahil declares his love for Isha to him who disagrees. In a fit of rage, Sahil tries to stab Sinha but is stopped by his mother Sharda. The next day, Sahil gets heavily drunk at the house of Dr Gandhi , Sinha's family doctor, who advises Sahil to accept Sheetal as his wife, reasoning that Sahil will lead a happier life with her. A drunk and still adamant Sahil returns home and finds, to his shock, that someone has stabbed Sinha. Before Sinha can reveal the name of the murderer, he dies, while Sharda arrives and, finding Sahil near his dead step-father holding a knife, assumes him to be the killer. Sahil is arrested and taken to court, where many of his acquaintances and Sharda testify against him. Sahil is found guilty and sentenced to 14 years in prison. Just before Sahil is transported to jail, he hands over a necklace to Sheetal, implying that it was left behind at the scene by the killer. He asks her to keep it safe. He also tells her that he has decided to find the real murderer at any cost, having finally realised Sinha's love for him.

In jail, Sahil relates his story to an old prisoner, who believes him to be innocent. The prisoner tells Sahil that the jail only has one escape route - a sewage gutter pipe that can be accessed from a flush toilet located in an unused chamber of the jail. Sahil creates a problem with two other prisoners, causing the jailor to confine them in the chamber. After great effort, the three succeed in escaping the jail by sea, with a boat arranged by Sheetal.

Police Commissioner Patwardhan assigns an unbending and upright police officer, Uddham Singh, to handle the case of Sahil's re-apprehension. Sahil secretly meets Isha at her home, where he calls Dr Gandhi for advice, and Dr Gandhi invites Sahil to his home. Sahil reaches the doctor's residence and is shocked to find that somebody has stabbed Dr Gandhi. Dr Gandhi's servant finds Sahil near the dead doctor and shrieks, forcing him to escape. Dr Gandhi's servant reports Sahil to the police.

Uddham Singh interrogates Sheetal, with whom Sahil still maintains a good relationship. Sheetal confesses to having spent the previous night with Sahil and also helping him escape jail. Singh does not arrest Sheetal for these wrongdoings for the time being, partly since he is highly focussed on apprehending Sahil, and partly due to Meghnad's influence and wealth.

Having now been accused of two murders, Sahil's resolve to find the murderer is strengthened. He first suspects advocate Thanawala, because Thanawala had a very good chance of obtaining part of Sinha's property and wealth upon his death, provided Sahil is out of the picture. He enters Thanawala's office and brutally interrogates him, throwing him out of his office on the second floor, from the window. Thanawala reveals that while he did initially intend to usurp his share of Sinha's property and wealth, he did not commit the murder. Sahil then goes to the docks to interrogate Chaudhry, whom he suspects because of his involvement in fraudulent business practices, that Sinha did not support, but Chaudhry claims innocence as well, and Sahil brutally beats up Chaudhry's brother during his escape, for trying to stab and apprehend him. The next is Vilas Rao, the corrupt socialist Union leader who had a strained relationship with Chaudhry and Sinha, who is beaten by Sahil before pointing the finger at Mantriji, alleging that Sinha's murder was a political assassination. Sahil and Sheetal trick Mantriji into attending a ceremony and kidnap him. Uddham Singh is also present there and realises that Sahil is not the real murderer after noticing his strong resolve.

Uddham Singh investigates further and finds that the murders have been committed with two knives of exactly the same build and shape, indicating that they could belong to a set. He finds the set of knives at Ishwar Dewan's house with two knives missing and arrests Dewan, who confesses to the killing of Sinha and Dr Gandhi. Dewan divulges to have murdered Sinha because he did not accept Isha as his daughter-in-law; and killed Dr Gandhi to cover up the first crime because the latter had realised his true intentions. At the same time, Sahil is interrogating Mantriji by boiling his legs, but Sheetal arrives and tells him that the murderer is Ishwar Dewan, and Sahil releases Mantriji. Isha, however, is shocked and tries to attack Sheetal, and later rushes to meet her father. Sahil, having finally been declared innocent, returns home and reconciles with his mother and half-brother.

Sahil gives the necklace that he found at the first crime scene to his half-brother Harsh, as nature of this necklace is still unknown at this point since Sahil had not realised that it could be opened, and none of the suspects recognised it. Harsh opens the necklace with a screwdriver and shows it to Sahil, who finds his and Isha's picture inside. This leads to one shocking reality, and Isha is the real killer. In the meantime, Isha enters Uddham Singh's house who does not spot her since he was drunk after a party that he threw for his success of solving the case. She stabs him multiple times, and closely escapes being spotted by Pandu and Neelkanth. Pandu rushes to the police station, while Neelkanth takes Uddham Singh to the hospital.

Sahil, along with Pandu now reaches the police station and interrogates the incarcerated Ishwar Dewan, who admits that Isha was indeed the murderer. He reveals that while Isha loves him immensely, she has had a massive anger management problem since her childhood, particularly when it comes to Sahil. As a child, she had killed Dr. Gandhi's dog after it bit Sahil, following which she was sent to a boarding school by Sinha and Dr. Gandhi to discipline her, despite Dewan's objections. Later, when she and Sahil reunited, her affection for Sahil grew to the point of possessiveness, and even more so after Sahil declared his love for her at his birthday party. She did not want to be separated from Sahil under any circumstance. After Sahil's argument with his father, Dewan and Isha had gone to meet Sinha the following morning, to request him to unite Sahil and Isha, whereupon the latter rejected and humiliated them in a fit of anger, and asked them to leave. Isha was so enraged that she later stabbed Sinha to death. When Dr. Gandhi realised that she was the culprit, she killed him as well. Dewan states that Isha killed the people who, in her opinion, were trying to keep her away from Sahil. She had considered revealing the truth and accept responsibility for the murders, but feared that Sahil would not accept her if she did so. Sahil is shocked beyond words, but understands that Isha will try to attack Sheetal next and calls her, asking her about whether she is alone or not, and tells her to lock all doors and entrances, and not let anyone inside. He rushes to her house but is attacked by Babu Anna, an assassin earlier hired by Mantriji to kill Sahil and Isha. Sahil is injured, but manages to incapacitate Babu Anna and reach the house.

Sheetal takes Sahil's warning jokingly, thinking that he might be coming to spend some private time with her, just as Isha arrives at her house. Sheetal is fooled by Isha at first, because the latter falsely apologises for her misbehaviour. However, Isha suddenly attacks Sheetal. Sahil arrives on time to save her and pulls Isha off Sheetal, who rushes into Sahil's arms. An enraged Isha, who thinks that she is nothing for Sahil anymore, tries to stab Sheetal in a last ditch attempt, but Babu Anna tries to intervene and is killed instead.  An injured and somewhat drunk Uddham Singh arrives with Neelkanth despite multiple attempts by Neelkanth to persuade him to rest, and shoots Isha, falling down the stairs to his supposed death. Isha begs Sahil for forgiveness, reaffirms her love for him, and dies in his arms. 

At the end, Mantriji is also brought to the hospital, with Neelkanth warning everyone to not indulge in dishonest practices and telling them to spend the rest of their lives in hospital, as all of them are permanently handicapped. During the credits, Sahil is joined by Sheetal in the club that he was seen in the beginning of the movie but now it's just the two of them and no one else as the two had begun a relationship.

Cast
 Bobby Deol as Sahil Sinha
 Manisha Koirala as Sheetal Choudhry, Sahil's best friend
 Kajol as Isha Diwan, Sahil's girlfriend
 Om Puri as Inspector Uddham Singh, a honest and upright police officer
 Raj Babbar as Governor Jaisingh Sinha, Sahil's step-father
 Paresh Rawal as Ishwar Diwan, Isha's father and Jaisingh's personal secretary
 Sadashiv Amrapurkar as Inspector Neelkanth Dixit, a meek police officer and assistant of Uddham Singh
 Ashok Saraf as Havaldar Pandu, a naïve constable assisting Neelkanth and Uddham Singh
 Prem Chopra as Sadanand Bose (Mantriji), a corrupt minister
 Kulbhushan Kharbanda as Dr. Shubham Gandhi
 Dalip Tahil as Meghnath Choudhry, Sheetal's father and an arrogant and powerful businessman
 Raza Murad as Gurdas Thanawala, Jaisingh's lawyer
 Sharat Saxena as Vilasrao Mahatre, a cruel and disliked union leader
 Harish Patel as Phoolchand Raze, Mantriji's merry secretary
 Mukesh Rishi as Babu Anna, Mantriji's bodyguard
 Tej Sapru as an abusive Jailer in the central prison
 Anjan Srivastav as Commissioner Manoj Patwardhan
 Vishwajeet Pradhan as a Bounty hunter, who wants to make a quick buck by capturing Sahil and getting the reward for doing so
 Dinesh Hingoo as Thanawala's servant
 Priya Tendulkar as Sharda Devi, Sahil's mother
 Bob Christo as Boat organiser
 Master Harsh Lunia as Harsh Sinha, Sahil's half-brother
 Aparajita as Surbhi Choudhry, Sheetal's mother

Music 

The music was composed by Viju Shah and the lyrics were written by Anand Bakshi. The title track of the film, "Gupt Gupt", samples the electronica track "Deep Forest" from the eponymous album by Deep Forest and the titular tracks from Mike Oldfield's seminal prog-rock orchestral debut Tubular Bells (revisited and sampled numerous times since). "Duniya Hasino Ka Mela" was sampled from "Masturi" included in the new age album Kojiki by Japanese keyboardist Kitarō.

The songs were shot at various locations in India including Munnar in Kerala, Manali and Rajasthan.

Shah's work on the soundtrack was well received. It won the Best Background Score and Shah was nominated for the Best Music Director, whereas Alka Yagnik was also nominated for the Best Female Playback Singer for "Mere Khwabon Me Tu".

Critical reception
Gupt received positive reviews from critics upon release. Fullhyderabad.com gave it a 7.5/10 rating and wrote, "It is a slickly-made film with stylish cinematography, beautiful locales, and pretty good performances. It falls in the genre of thriller movies and fares much better than any of its sorry predecessors did. The director, Rajiv Rai is not over-awed by the subject and so does not make a hosh-posh out of the whole thing." Mohammad Ali Ikram of Planet Bollywood praised the suspense and music.

Boxoffice
Gupt was released on 4 July 1997 at 250 screens in India.

On the opening day it collected ₹9.6 million and by the opening weekend it had grossed ₹27.8 million. The first week collections were ₹53.45 million with an India gross of ₹317.2 million. Worldwide gross collections were ₹332.3 million, with an overseas gross of US$425,000. The adjusted net-gross of the film is ₹1.68 billion.

It was a Blockbuster, becoming the fourth-highest grossing of the year after Dil To Pagal Hai, Border and Pardes.

Accolades
Kajol became the first actress in the history of the Filmfare Awards to win the Best Performance in a Negative Role.

43rd Filmfare Awards:

See also
 Red herring (narrative)
 Twist ending

References

External links
 

1997 films
Trimurti Films
1990s Hindi-language films
Indian action thriller films
Indian crime thriller films
Indian mystery thriller films
Films scored by Viju Shah
Indian psychological thriller films
1997 action thriller films
1997 crime thriller films
1990s mystery thriller films
1990s psychological thriller films
Films directed by Rajiv Rai
Films shot in Manali, Himachal Pradesh
Films shot in Kerala
Films shot in Munnar
Films shot in Rajasthan